Lamine Kanté (born 11 February 1987) is a French basketball player who currently plays for AS Monaco Basket of the LNB Pro A.

References

1987 births
Living people
Cholet Basket players
French men's basketball players
Limoges CSP players
Small forwards